Sansun Nosansun is a 2003 Sri Lankan Sinhala adult drama film directed by Suresh Kumarasinghe and produced by Niroshan Devapriya for Nethra Anjana Films. It stars Arjuna Kamalanath and Nilushi Helpita in lead roles along with Janesh Silva and Teddy Vidyalankara. Music composed by Nadeeka Guruge. It is the 1008th Sri Lankan film in the Sinhala cinema.

Plot

Cast
 Arjuna Kamalanath
 Nilushi Helpita
 Janesh Silva
 Chathura Perera
 Teddy Vidyalankara
 Rex Kodippili
 Piyatillaka Atapattu
 Sunil Bamunuarachchi
 Chandani Silva

References

2003 films
2000s Sinhala-language films